Gauvreau is a surname. Notable people with the surname include:

Charles Arthur Gauvreau (1860–1924), Canadian author and politician
Claude Gauvreau (1925-1971), Quebec playwright, poet and polemicist
Louis Gauvreau (1761–1822), businessman and politician in Lower Canada
Louis-Honoré Gauvreau (1812–1858), physician and politician in Canada East
Marcelle Gauvreau (1907-1968), Canadian botanist and science educator
Pierre Gauvreau (born 1922), Quebec painter
René Gauvreau, Quebec politician
Robert Gauvreau, Ontario businessman and philanthropist

See also
Gauvreau, New Brunswick, community in Canada